Edsvik Konsthall (Edsvik Art Gallery) is a Swedish art gallery situated at Edsberg, an 18th-century estate at Edsviken in the north of Stockholm, Sweden. The gallery focuses on Swedish and international contemporary art.  Some 15–20 exhibitions of Swedish and international artists are held at the gallery each year. Edsvik Konsthall is the second largest art gallery in Sweden. The art gallery consists of two main buildings; gallery east and gallery west. The director, Ricardo Donoso, was hired by Sollentuna Municipality in 2004.

History
The ambition of running an art gallery started with the artist group Konstnärsgruppen which was established 1985 by a group of artists living in Sollentuna. In 1986 the society Friends of Stallbacken (Stallbackens vänner) was established for the purpose of building a community center in Sollentuna which was named Duvslaget. In 1994 the group presented an outline to Sollentuna municipality for their project Konsthall Stallbacken. The ambition was to create a meeting place for artists, trade and industry as well as the public, both for the municipality of Sollentuna and the rest of Stockholm. Edsvik Konsthall was founded in May 1996 and is located at Stallbacken next to Edsberg  in Sollentuna municipality. The buildings at Stallbacken consist of stable and barn buildings which originally belonged to Edsbergs. The castle and stallbacken have been owned by Sollentuna municipality since the 1970s.

Directors
 Maria Fridh 1996-2002
 Stefie Goudaki 2002-2003
 Ricardo Donoso 2004-

Gallery

References

External links 
Edsvik Konsthall website 
 stallbackens vänner website

Art museums and galleries in Stockholm
Art museums established in 1996
1996 establishments in Sweden